Antigua and Barbuda competed in the 2010 Commonwealth Games held in Delhi, India, from 3 to 14 October 2010. Despite concerns about safety and their accommodations, the team planned to compete. Antigua and Barbuda competed in athletics, cycling, shooting, swimming and boxing. The delegation was made up of seventeen athletes and nine officials.

Competitors

Athletics

Men
Track & road events

Field events

Women
Field events

Boxing

Antigua entered one boxer into the light heavyweight classification.

Cycling

Road

Men

See also
 2010 Commonwealth Games

References

Nations at the 2010 Commonwealth Games
Antigua and Barbuda at the Commonwealth Games
2010 in Antigua and Barbuda sport